Thuringbert (735–770), Count of Hesbaye and Count of Wormsgau, was a brother of Cancor, Count of Hesbaye and thus possibly a son of Cancor's mother Williswinda and perhaps her late husband Robert.

Thuringbert and his wife (name unknown) had one child:
 Robert II, Count of Hesbaye

Thuringbert was succeeded as Count of Hesbaye by his son Robert.

Primary records defining Thurincbert

The only primary records mentioning Thurincbert describe him as a brother of Count Cancor, and father of a man named Robert. Cancor was a son of a woman named Williswinda.

References

Sources 

735 births
770 deaths
Counts of Hesbaye